Kate Trotter (born February 5, 1953) is a Canadian film, television and stage actress.

Career
Her television roles have included appearances in Wild Roses, Covert Affairs, Lost Girl, The Newsroom, Paradise Falls, Earth: Final Conflict, Kung Fu: The Legend Continues, The Jane Show, Republic of Doyle, Blue Murder, Murdoch Mysteries, Friday the 13th: the Series and Sue Thomas F.B. Eye, while her film roles have included Beyond Borders, Joshua Then and Now, Martha, Ruth and Edie, Murder in the Hamptons, Glory Enough for All, The First Season, Murder in Space, Taking a Chance on Love, Clarence and Tru Love. She won a Gemini Award for Guest Actress in a Dramatic Series in 2003 for Blue Murder.

Her stage roles have included Miss Havisham in Great Expectations, Madge Kendal in The Elephant Man, Alma in Summer and Smoke, Juliet in Romeo and Juliet, Hermione in The Winter's Tale, Katie in Quiet in the Land and Ann Whitfield in Man and Superman. She has been a three-time Dora Mavor Moore Award winner for her stage roles.

In addition to her own acting, Trotter has also taught acting at George Brown College and the Armstrong Studio, and works as a professional communication coach.

She also worked as a voice actress, providing her voice for Queen Nehelenia in the original English dub of the fourth season of the Sailor Moon anime in 2000.

Personal life
She was briefly married in the 1980s to theatre director Guy Sprung.

References

External links
 
 Kate Trotter

1953 births
Canadian film actresses
Canadian television actresses
Canadian stage actresses
Actresses from Toronto
Living people
20th-century Canadian actresses
21st-century Canadian actresses